Harpalus fuscipalpis is a species of ground beetle in the subfamily Harpalinae. It was described by Sturm in 1818.

References

fuscipalpis
Beetles described in 1818